Greetings From Mercury was a Belgian jazz fusion group led by saxophonist Jeroen Van Herzeele.  The group included the members of the Jeroen Van Herzeele Trio, plus bassist Otti Van Der Werf, rapper Steve Segers and sound engineer/producer/sitarist Michel Andina, who recorded all their albums and played on the last two.  They released their first album, Greetings From Mercury, under Van Herzeele's name.

Members
 Jeroen Van Herzeele - tenor saxophone
 Peter Hertmans - guitar
 Otti Van Der Werf - bass
 Stéphane Galland - drums
 Steven Segers - rap
 Michel Andina - sitar

Discography
 Greetings From Mercury (1998)
 Continuance (1999)
 Heiwa (2002)

References
 Jazz in Belgium website

Belgian jazz ensembles
Jazz fusion ensembles